David Hill studied photography before beginning his career in music in 1994 as a member of the Ballistic Brothers, together with Ashley Beedle and Rocky & Diesel (of X-Press 2). The Ballistic Brothers released two albums, a number of singles, and also work with many artists, including the Brand New Heavies, D*Note, Ronny Jordan and Depeche Mode.

In 1994 Hill co-founded the Nuphonic record label and managed all creative aspects, releasing albums with Faze Action, Norman Jay, Maurice Fulton, Andrew Weatherall and David Mancuso. In addition to the label, Nuphonic also produced the London Xpress radio show for Xfm.

Since choosing to close the Nuphonic label, Hill has consulted for Soul Jazz Records, co-ordinating The World of Arthur Russell project in 2004, and the Soul Gospel series. He is also creative consultant for Auralux, the reggae re-issue record label, and has worked with Lee "Scratch" Perry, King Jammy, Barrington Levy and Sly & Robbie, as well as also being a consultant to Universal Music and V2 Records.

He worked as a freelance events consultant, producing product launches for brands such as Puma, Siemens, Absolut and Levi’s, and also for art galleries such as Haunch of Venison.

In 2006, together with veteran composer Damian Montagu, Hill formed Radial Music - primarily a composition and music supervision company. Clients include advertising agencies and also Disney, for whom Radial supervises musical content of its video games.

References 

Year of birth missing (living people)
Living people